Tamon or Tamón may refer to:
short form of Tamonten, Japanese for Vaisravana
Tamón, a parish of Carreño, Asturias, Spain
Tamon (name), a Japanese given name

See also
Taman (disambiguation)